Sheri Smallwood Gilligan (born March 25, 1963) is an American politician who served in the Georgia House of Representatives for the 24th district from 2015 to 2023. Gilligan was first elected in 2015 in a special election after previous representative Mark Hamilton resigned; she beat out three other opponents to complete Hamilton's remaining 18-month term.

Gilligan was born and raised in Forsyth County. While in high school, she competed at rifle shooting and set a new state record. After graduating from the University of Georgia, Gilligan moved to the Washington, D.C. area, where she worked as an intelligence analyst for two decades, including at the CIA. She also joined the Naval Reserve.

She is also a substitute teacher for Forsyth County Schools; she previously taught as an adjunct instructor at Lanier Technical College.

A self-described conservative, Gilligan supports gun rights, wants to lower taxes, and restricting abortion.

Gilligan plays the oboe.

Elections

Special election, 2015
A special election was held on June 16, 2015 to fill Mark Hamilton's seat in district 24. Gilligan won the election with nearly half the vote.

General election, 2016
Gilligan ran unopposed during the 2016 primaries, going on to earn 25,996 votes in the general election.

Primary and general elections, 2018
In 2018, Gilligan was challenged during the May 22 primary elections by Joanna Cloud, but defeated Cloud with 60% of the vote.

In the general election, Gillian ran unopposed once again, garnering 23,646 votes.

Primary and general elections, 2022
Gilligan was defeated by Carter Barrett in a runoff in 2022.

References

1963 births
Living people
Republican Party members of the Georgia House of Representatives
21st-century American politicians
21st-century American women politicians
Women state legislators in Georgia (U.S. state)